Ahmadu Musa Kida is a Nigerian engineer and former basketball player. He  hails from Borno State in Nigeria . He is the Deputy Managing Director, Deep Water Services, of Total Nigeria, and he is also the president of the Nigerian Basketball Federation.

Education
Kida received his degree in civil engineering from Ahmadu Bello University, Zaria, in 1984. He obtained a postgraduate diploma in petroleum engineering from the Institut Francaise du Petrol (IFP) in Paris.

Career
Kida started his career as a professional at ELF Petroleum Nigeria as a trainee engineer and materials coordinator. Mr Musa joined Total Exploration & Production Nigeria in 1985 and has over 32 years’ experience in the Oil and Gas industry. Mr Musa was appointed the Deputy Managing Director of TEPNG Deepwater District as well as on the Board member of Total Upstream Companies in Nigeria on August 1, 2015.

Kida became a member of the Total E&P Nigeria board in 2014 as executive director for the Port Harcourt district.

In August 2015, Kida was appointed as the deputy managing director of the Deepwater district in Lagos.

Membership 
Mr Musa attended several professional courses that includes the prestigious Massachusetts Institute of Technology and the Harvard Business School both in the USA.

He is a member of Society of Petroleum Engineers International, a chartered Fellow of the Nigerian Society of Engineers (NSE) as well as a registered Member of the Council for the Regulation of Engineering in Nigeria (COREN).

Mr Musa plays Basketball and is the current President of the Board of Nigerian Basketball Federation (NBBF)

Nigerian Basketball Federation
Kida was elected president of the Nigerian Basketball Federation (NBBF) in June 2017.

Personal life
Kida is married and has four children.

References

Nigerian engineers
Nigerian men's basketball players
Ahmadu Bello University alumni
Living people
Year of birth missing (living people)